Mario de Bernardi (1893–1959) was an Italian World War I fighter pilot, seaplane air racer of the 1920s, and test pilot of early Italian experimental jets.

Early life
De Bernardi was born on 1 July 1893 in Venosa, Italy. In 1911, at the age of 18, he served in the Italian armed forces during the Italo-Turkish War (1911–1912), where he witnessed the first military use of airplanes in combat. He returned to Italy resolved to become a pilot, and he received his pilots license in 1914.

Flying achievements

World War I
When Italy entered World War I (1914–1918) on the side of the Allies in 1915, de Bernardi was in the 2nd Regiment of the Piedmont Royal Cavalry. He joined the Italian Air Service and became the first Italian credited with destroying an enemy aircraft in the air when he shot one down over Verona. By the end of the war in November 1918 he had received credit for the destruction of four Austro-Hungarian aircraft with an additional one unconfirmed kill.

De Bernardi later became an aircraft parts inspector and the director of the experimental airfields at Montecelio, Furbara, and Vigna di Valle.

Schneider Trophy races and world speed records

After World War I, de Bernardi began racing seaplanes in the international races being held at the time. Perhaps his greatest success in these races came on 13 November 1926, when then-Major de Bernardi, representing Italy, won the Schneider Trophy race at Hampton Roads, Virginia, in the United States.

On 26 September 1927, de Bernardi again was among the pilots representing Italy in the Schneider Trophy race, this time held in Venice, Italy. Flying a Macchi M.52 racing seaplane, de Bernardi was forced to retire early from the race with engine trouble. He went on to set yet another world speed record on 30 March 1928, flying a Macchi M.52R racing seaplane  at Venice, becoming both the first person to exceed  and the first person to exceed .

Later career
At the turn of the 1930s de Bernardi joined the Caproni company at Taliedo, near Milan, serving as a test pilot and technical consultant . In 1931 he won the world aerobatics championship  at Cleveland, Ohio, in the United States.

In 1939, de Bernardi moved to Rome, where he resided for the rest of his life. In 1940 he began to participate in the development of the first remotely controlled aircraft intended for use as flying bombs.

On 27 August 1940 de Bernardi piloted the Caproni Campini N.1 - sometimes called "Caproni Campini CC.2" - experimental motorjet aircraft on its first flight; the Fédération Aéronautique Internationale considered it the first successful flight of a jet aircraft until news of the August 1939 flight of the German Heinkel He 178 jet later became public. On 30 November 1941 de Bernardi flew an N.1 from Milan to Guidonia Montecelio in about two hours carrying aerograms with canceled postage stamps, becoming the first pilot to carry air mail in a jet aircraft.

De Bernardi designed the M.d.B. 02 Aeroscooter, a two-seat light sport aircraft, whose first flight was in 1957.

Death

On 8 April 1959 de Bernardi went to a Rome airport to see a German light plane demonstration, and flew his own light plane, showing off his aerobatic skills. While in the air, he began to experience a heart attack. He managed to land the aircraft, only to die minutes later at the age of 65.

Honors, Awards, and Commemoration

In 1926, de Bernardi received the National Trophy - one of the four Harmon Trophies awarded at the time - as Italys outstanding aviator of that year.

De Bernardi received the Gold Medal of Valor (Aviation), given to "Reward acts of singular courage, skill, and philanthropy committed on board aircraft in flight." De Bernardis achievements also led the Italian military to name the Italian Air Forces largest base, Pratica di Mare Air Force Base, located southwest of Rome, after him as "Colonello Mario de Bernardi" in 1959.
 
In March 2006, a plaque honoring de Bernardi was placed at Via Panama 86 - his home from 1939 to 1959 - in Rome as his daughter Fiorenza looked on.

Notes

References
Donald, David, ed. The Complete Encyclopedia of World Aircraft. New York: Barnes & Noble Books, 1997. .

External links

Newsreel footage of Major Mario de Bernardi and his Macchi M.39 racing seaplane after winning the 1926 Schneider Trophy race 

1893 births
1959 deaths
Aerobatic pilots
Italian air racers
Italian aviation record holders
Italian aviators
Italian test pilots
Italian World War I flying aces
Harmon Trophy winners
Schneider Trophy pilots
Caproni people
People from Venosa
Sportspeople from Basilicata